Ahmet Ferit Tek (1877 – 25 November 1971) was an Ottoman-born Turkish military officer, academic, politician, government minister and diplomat.

Early life
Ahmet Ferit Tek was born to Mustafa Reşit, an accountant at the Ottoman Ministry of Finance, and his wife Hanife Leyla in Bursa in 1877. According to another source, he was born on  7 March 1878. He had a brother İbrahim Refet Tek.

He studied at Kuleli Military High School, and graduated from the  Turkish Military Academy in the rank of a Loeutnant.

In exile
He joined the Young Turks movement, which aimed the restoration of the suspended Ottoman constitution of 1876. He was arrested and exiled to Ottoman Tripolitania, what is today part of Libya. However, he managed to escape to Paris, France, via Tunis. In Paris, he studied Political Science, and graduated. During this time, he also wrote for Şura-yı Ümmet ("People's Council", 1902–1929), an Ottoman periodical published by the Committee of Union and Progress of the Young Turks movement. After living in Kazan, Russian Empire between 1903–1908, he settled in Egypt. In Cairo, he wrote for the local newspaper Türk.

Return to home
In 1908, Ahmet Ferit returned to Istanbul, and was appointed history professor at Istanbul University's School of Political Science. He co-founded "Milli Meşrutiyet Fırkası" ("National Constitutional Monarchy Party"). The ideas in the party programme of the nationalistic movement were "The Turks had fought on the frontiers of the Empire for centuries. They had to neglect their own land. Anatolia, the heart of Turkish territories, is uncared. The time has come for Turks to think over their own national destiny." On 25 March 1912, he co-founded  Türk Ocakları (Turkish Hearths), a nationalistic organization, with Mehmet Emin Yurdakul (1869–1944), Ahmet Ağaoğlu (1869–1939), Yusuf Akçura (1876–1935) and some others. He was elected chairman of the organization in the first board meeting succeeding Yurdakul, the founding president. He published the newspaper İlham ("Inspiration"), where he wrote hot.

Turkish War of Independence and Republican era
During the Turkish War of Independence, he supported the Kemalists. He entered the newly established parliament in Ankara as a deputy of Istanbul. He was appointed  Minister of Finance in the 1st cabinet of the Executive Ministers in the Government of the Grand National Assembly on 17 July 1920. He served at this post until the end of the 2nd  cabinet of the Executive Ministers on 19 May 1921. He took part in the Turkish delegation sent to the Conference of Lausanne (1922–1923). After the proclamation of the Turkish Republic, he remained in the parliament as a deputy of Kütahya, and was appointed the Minister of the Interior in the 1st and the 2nd cabinet of İsmet İnönü between 30 October 1923  and 22 November 1924.

After 1925, he chose a diplomatic career. He was appointed ambassador to London (1925–1932), Warsaw (1932–1939), and Tokio (1939–1943).

Private life
Ahmet Ferit married to Müfide Meryem Fevziyye (1892–1971) in Paris in 1907. Ahmet Ferit and she met each other in Tripoli of Ottoman Libya, where he was in exile and she was because of her father's service. They escaped from Tripoli to Paris, where she got married at the age of 15. From this marriage, a daughter Emel Esin, who became an art historian, was born. Müfide Tek became later a renowned novelist.

Ahmet Ferit Tek died in Istanbul on 25 November 1971, eight months after his wife's death.

References

External links

1877 births
People from Bursa
Kuleli Military High School alumni
Turkish Military Academy alumni
Ottoman Army officers
Young Turks
Politicians of the Ottoman Empire
Academics from the Ottoman Empire
Academic staff of Istanbul University
Republican People's Party (Turkey) politicians
Deputies of Istanbul
Ministers of Finance of Turkey
Deputies of Kütahya
Ministers of the Interior of Turkey
Members of the 1st government of Turkey
Members of the 2nd government of Turkey
20th-century Turkish diplomats
Ambassadors of Turkey to the United Kingdom
Ambassadors of Turkey to Poland
Ambassadors of Turkey to Japan
1971 deaths
Members of the 2nd Parliament of Turkey